The Surrey Senior League was an English regional football league for teams based in Surrey although teams from outside the county were often admitted as well. The league existed from 1922 until 1978, when it was rebranded as the Home Counties League in an attempt to attract teams from a wider catchment area.  After one season the league changed its name once again to the Combined Counties League, under which name it continues to operate.
For three seasons between 1968 and 1971 the league had two divisions. The top division was called the Premier Division, the lower division was Division One.

Champions
The champions of the league were as follows:

1922–23  Egham
1923–24  Farnham United Breweries
1924–25  Farnham United Breweries
1925–26  Epsom Town
1926–27  Epsom Town
1927–28  Aldershot Traction Company
1928–29  Dorking
1929–30  Dorking
1930–31  Camberley & Yorktown
1931–32  Camberley & Yorktown
1932–33  Camberley & Yorktown
1933–34  Banstead Mental Hospital
1934–35  Wills Sports
1935–36  Hersham
1936–37  Walton-on-Thames
1937–38  Metropolitan Police
1938–39  Hersham
1939–46  No competition due to Second World War
1946–47  Leatherhead
1947–48  Leatherhead
1948–49  Leatherhead
1949–50  Leatherhead
1950–51  Banstead Athletic
1951–52  Banstead Athletic
1952–53  Banstead Athletic

1953–54  Banstead Athletic
1954–55  Dorking
1955–56  Dorking
1956–57  Banstead Athletic
1957–58  Molesey
1958–59  Malden Town
1959–60  Chertsey Town
1960–61  Addlestone
1961–62  Chertsey Town
1962–63  Chertsey Town
1963–64  Hampton
1964–65  Banstead Athletic
1965–66  Farnham Town
1966–67  Farnham Town
1967–68  Farnham Town
1968–69 Premier Division –  Whyteleafe, Division One – Ashtead
1969–70 Premier Division –  Bracknell Town, Division One – Colliers Wood United
1970–71 Premier Division –   Malden Town, Division One – Chessington & Hook United
1971–72  Merstham
1972–73  Westfield
1973–74  Westfield
1974–75  Epsom & Ewell
1975–76  Wandsworth
1976–77  Horley Town
1977–78  Malden Vale

References

 
Football in Surrey
Defunct football leagues in England